Wilson House may refer to:

Canada
 Wilson House (Meech Lake), Quebec, location of the 1987 constitutional consensus

England
 Wilson House, London

United States
 McKleroy-Wilson-Kirby House, Anniston, Alabama, listed on the NRHP in Alabama
Catlin Wilson House, Eutaw, Alabama, NRHP-listed
Wilson-Clements House, Northport, Alabama, listed on the NRHP in Alabama
Wilson-Finlay House, Gainestown, Alabama, NRHP-listed
Wilson-Pittman-Campbell-Gregory House, Fayetteville, Arkansas, NRHP-listed
 Wilson House (Russellville, Arkansas), NRHP-listed
 Wilson Hall-Arkansas Tech University, Russellville, Arkansas, listed on the NRHP in Arkansas
Wilson-Martin House, Warren, Arkansas, NRHP-listed
C. J. (Blinky) Wilson House, Casa Grande, Arizona, listed on the NRHP in Arizona
Charles Wilson, Jr., House, Flagstaff, Arizona, listed on the NRHP in Arizona
J. Mark Wilson House, Safford, Arizona, listed on the NRHP in Arizona
J. C. Wilson House, Willcox, Arizona, listed on the NRHP in Arizona
 Wilson House (Silver Lake, Los Angeles), California, listed as a Los Angeles HCM
 Wilson House (Palo Alto, California), listed on the NRHP in California
Warren Wilson Beach House, Venice, California, NRHP-listed
Blanche A. Wilson House, Aurora, Colorado, NRHP-listed
 John Wilson House (Jewett City, Connecticut), NRHP-listed
Edward R. Wilson House, Newark, Delaware, NRHP-listed
 Savin-Wilson House, Smyrna, Delaware, NRHP-listed
Woodrow Wilson House (Washington, D.C.), NRHP-listed
Wilson House (Pensacola, Florida), a work of architect Bruce Goff similar to his Donald Pollock House
Dr. C. B. Wilson House, Sarasota, Florida, NRHP-listed
Judge William Wilson House, Atlanta, Georgia, NRHP-listed
Woodrow Wilson Boyhood Home, Augusta, Georgia, NRHP-listed
Wilson-Finney-Land House, Madison, Georgia, listed on the NRHP in Georgia
 Wilson House (Cambridge, Idaho), listed on the NRHP in Idaho
Judge Isaac Wilson House, Batavia, Illinois, NRHP-listed
Wilson-Courtney House, Danville, Indiana, listed on the NRHP in Indiana
 Barnett-Seawright-Wilson House, Delphi, Indiana, listed on the NRHP in Indiana
 The Wilson, Indianapolis, Indiana, listed on the NRHP in Indiana
J. Woodrow Wilson House, Marion, Indiana, listed on the NRHP in Indiana
Solomon Wilson Building, Wabash, Indiana, listed on the NRHP in Indiana
 Knapp-Wilson House, Ames, Iowa, listed on the NRHP in Iowa
Asa Wilson House, Bloomfield, Iowa, listed on the NRHP in Iowa
 John Wilson House (De Soto, Iowa), listed on the NRHP in Iowa
Seth and Elizabeth Wilson House, Earlham, Iowa, listed on the NRHP in Iowa
US Senator James F. Wilson House, Fairfield, Iowa, listed on the NRHP in Iowa
Anson Wilson House, Maquoketa, Iowa, listed on the NRHP in Iowa
Wilson-Boyle House, Wichita, Kansas, listed on the NRHP in Sedgwick County, Kansas
Fred D. Wilson House, Wichita, Kansas, listed on the NRHP in Sedgwick County, Kansas
Gordon Wilson Hall, Bowling Green, Kentucky, listed on the NRHP in Kentucky
 William Wilson House (Elizabethtown, Kentucky), listed on the NRHP in Kentucky
R. H. Wilson House, Greensburg, Kentucky, listed on the NRHP in Kentucky
Paul Wilson Place, Lancaster, Kentucky, listed on the NRHP in Kentucky
 Scott and Wilson Houses District, Lexington, Kentucky, listed on the NRHP in Kentucky
David Wilson House, Louisville, Kentucky, listed on the NRHP in Kentucky
Benjamin Wilson House, Versailles, Kentucky, listed on the NRHP in Kentucky
Wilson Hall (Bucksport, Maine), listed on the NRHP in Maine
Rufus Wilson Complex, Clear Spring, Maryland, listed on the NRHP in Maryland
Wilson-Miller Farm, Sharpsburg, Maryland, listed on the NRHP in Maryland
 Wilson's Inheritance, Union Bridge, Maryland, listed on the NRHP in Maryland
Capt. John Wilson House and Bates Ship Chandlery, Cohasset, Massachusetts, listed on the NRHP in Massachusetts
Shoreborne Wilson House, Ipswich, Massachusetts, listed on the NRHP in Massachusetts
Judge Robert S. Wilson House, Ann Arbor, Michigan, listed on the NRHP in Michigan
 Wilson Barn, Livonia, Michigan, listed on the NRHP in Michigan
Hudson Wilson House, Faribault, Minnesota, listed on the NRHP in Minnesota
 Brown-Wilson House, Enterprise, Mississippi, listed on the NRHP in Mississippi
 Wilson House (Monticello, Mississippi), listed on the NRHP in Mississippi
Ephraim J. Wilson Farm Complex, Palmyra, Missouri, listed on the NRHP in Missouri
 Wilson House (Alberton, Montana), listed on the NRHP in Montana
Victor E. Wilson House, Stromsburg, Nebraska, listed on the NRHP in Nebraska
 Seabrook-Wilson House, Middletown, New Jersey, NRHP-listed
Warren Wilson House, Cape Vincent, New York, NRHP-listed
 Wilson House (Garrison, New York), NRHP-listed
Albert E. and Emily Wilson House, Mamaroneck, New York, NRHP-listed
Aaron Wilson House, Ovid, New York, NRHP-listed
 Wilson House (Oyster Bay, New York), a house on the Oyster Bay History Walk tour
Edmund Wilson House, Port Leyden, New York, NRHP-listed
Milton Wilson House, Rushville, New York, NRHP-listed
 Wilson Cottage, Saranac Lake, New York, NRHP-listed
Wilson-Vines House, Beaver Dam, North Carolina, NRHP-listed
 John E. Wilson House, Dunn, North Carolina, NRHP-listed
 William J. Wilson House, Gastonia, North Carolina, NRHP-listed
Lucy and J. Vassie Wilson House, High Point, North Carolina, NRHP-listed
 Wilson Log House, Highlands, North Carolina, NRHP-listed
 Rudisill-Wilson House, Newton, North Carolina, NRHP-listed
 Wilfong-Wilson Farm, Startown, North Carolina, NRHP-listed
Wilson-Gibson House, Cincinnati, Ohio, NRHP-listed
Samuel and Sally Wilson House, Cincinnati, Ohio, NRHP-listed
George D. Wilson House, Madison, Ohio, listed on the NRHP in Ohio
 John T. Wilson Homestead, Seaman, Ohio, listed on the NRHP in Ohio
Wilson-Lenox House, Sidney, Ohio, listed on the NRHP in Ohio
Valentine Wilson House, Somerford, Ohio, listed on the NRHP in Ohio
 Wilson Feed Mill, Valley View, Ohio, listed on the NRHP in Ohio
 Willie W. Wilson House, Fort Towson, Oklahoma, listed on the NRHP in Oklahoma
James O. Wilson House, Corvallis, Oregon, listed on the NRHP in Oregon
Andrew P. Wilson House, Milwaukie, Oregon, listed on the NRHP in Oregon
 Jacobs-Wilson House, Portland, Oregon, listed on the NRHP in Oregon
Wilson-South House, Portland, Oregon, listed on the NRHP in Oregon
 William T. E. Wilson Homestead, Sisters, Oregon, listed on the NRHP in Oregon
George Wilson Homestead, Centennial, Pennsylvania, listed on the NRHP in Pennsylvania
Robert Wilson House, Coatesville, Pennsylvania, listed on the NRHP in Pennsylvania
Wilson-Winslow House, Coventry, Rhode Island, listed on the NRHP in Rhode Island
Thomas Woodrow Wilson Boyhood Home, Columbia, South Carolina, listed on the NRHP in South Carolina
 Wilson House (Fort Mill, South Carolina), listed on the NRHP in South Carolina
 John Calvin Wilson House, Indiantown, South Carolina, listed on the NRHP in South Carolina
Wilson-Clary House, Laurens, South Carolina, listed on the NRHP in South Carolina
Monroe Wilson House, Ridgeway, South Carolina, listed on the NRHP in South Carolina
 Wilson House (York, South Carolina), listed on the NRHP in South Carolina
Greenberry Wilson House, Burke, Tennessee, listed on the NRHP in Tennessee
Wilson-Young House, Dellrose, Tennessee, listed on the NRHP in Tennessee
 Boyd-Wilson Farm, Franklin, Tennessee, listed on the NRHP in Tennessee
Joseph Wilson House, Franklin, Tennessee, listed on the NRHP in Tennessee
Sanford Wilson House, Fredonia, Tennessee, listed on the NRHP in Tennessee
 Wilson Homesite, Clifton, Texas, listed on the NRHP in Texas
 Wilson House (Houston, Texas), listed on the NRHP in Texas
A. G. Wilson House, McKinney, Texas, listed on the NRHP in Texas
Ammie Wilson House, Plano, Texas, listed on the NRHP in Texas
Homer Wilson Ranch, Santa Elena Junction, Texas, listed on the NRHP in Texas
Ralph and Sunny Wilson, Sr. House, Temple, Texas, see the National Register of Historic Places listings in Bell County, Texas
Wilson House and Farmstead, Midway, Utah, listed on the NRHP in Utah
Wilson-Shields House, Park City, Utah, listed on the NRHP in Utah
 William W. and Christene Wilson House, Sandy, Utah, listed on the NRHP in Utah
 Woodrow Wilson Birthplace, Staunton, Virginia
 Bill Wilson House, East Dorset, Vermont, NRHP-listed
 Mary Park Wilson House, Gerrardstown, West Virginia, NRHP-listed
 William Wilson House (Gerrardstown, West Virginia), NRHP-listed
 Wilson-Kuykendall Farm, Moorefield, West Virginia, NRHP-listed
 Wilson-Wodrow-Mytinger House, Romney, West Virginia, NRHP-listed

See also
John Wilson House (disambiguation)
William Wilson House (disambiguation)
Woodrow Wilson House (disambiguation)
Wilson Bridge (disambiguation)
Wilson Building (disambiguation)
 Wilson Hall (disambiguation)
Wilson School (disambiguation)